Jaroslav Levinský and Filip Polášek were the defending champions, but Levinský didn't participate this year.
Polášek chose to play with Leoš Friedl. However, they lost to Máximo González and Sebastián Prieto in the first round.
Robert Lindstedt and Horia Tecău won in the final 6–4, 7–5, against Andreas Seppi and Simone Vagnozzi.

Seeds

Draw

Draw

External links
 Main Draw

Swedish Open - Men's Doubles
Swedish Open
Swedish